Joseph Anderson (1895–1959) was a Scottish professional footballer who played as a centre forward. During his career he played in the English Football League with Burnley, being part of the squad who won the 1920–21 Football League championship, as well as being on the books at several Scottish teams, primarily Clydebank.

References

1895 births
1959 deaths
Footballers from Renfrewshire
Scottish footballers
Association football forwards
Vale of Leven F.C. players
Airdrieonians F.C. (1878) players
Clydebank F.C. (1914) players
Burnley F.C. players
English Football League players
Scottish Football League players
People from Bishopton